Ibrahim Kamara (born 17 May 1966) is an Ivorian football manager.

Career
Kamara coached the U17 national team at the 2013 FIFA U-17 World Cup.

Kamara coached the Ivory Coast "CHAN" team at the 2018 African Nations Championship tournament. Ivory Coast finished bottom of Group B with 1 point.

In July 2018, he was appointed coach of the Ivory Coast national football team.

In February 2020, he exited the Ivory Coast National Football team as the head coach.

References

1966 births
Ivory Coast national football team managers
Living people
2019 Africa Cup of Nations managers
Ivorian football managers